Goran Obradović (Serbian Cyrillic: Горан Обрадовић; born 1 March 1976) is a Serbian former professional footballer who played as a midfielder.

Career
Born in Aranđelovac, Obradović joined Partizan in 1996, spending the next four and a half years at the club. He won three major trophies with the Crno-beli, two domestic league titles (1997 and 1999) and one national cup in 1998. In the winter of 2001, Obradović moved abroad and signed with Swiss club Servette. He also briefly played for St. Gallen and Vaduz, before moving to Sion in 2005. Subsequently, Obradović spent the following seven seasons at the club, winning the Swiss Cup on three occasions (2006, 2009 and 2011), scoring in two of the finals (2006 and 2009).

Honours
Partizan
 First League of FR Yugoslavia: 1996–97, 1998–99
 FR Yugoslavia Cup: 1997–98
Sion
 Swiss Cup: 2005–06, 2008–09, 2010–11

References

External links
 
 
 

Association football midfielders
Association football forwards
Expatriate footballers in Kazakhstan
Expatriate footballers in Liechtenstein
Expatriate footballers in Switzerland
FC Monthey players
FC Sion players
FC Spartak Semey players
FC St. Gallen players
FC Vaduz players
First League of Serbia and Montenegro players
FK Partizan players
Kazakhstan Premier League players
People from Aranđelovac
Serbian expatriate footballers
Serbian expatriate sportspeople in Kazakhstan
Serbian expatriate sportspeople in Liechtenstein
Serbian expatriate sportspeople in Switzerland
Serbian footballers
Servette FC players
Swiss Challenge League players
Swiss Super League players
1976 births
Living people